Moritz Seider (born 6 April 2001) is a German professional ice hockey defenseman for the Detroit Red Wings in the National Hockey League (NHL). He was selected sixth overall by the Red Wings in the 2019 NHL Entry Draft.

Playing career
A top prospect for the 2019 NHL Entry Draft, he was tabbed as "the best German defense prospect since Christian Ehrhoff" by The Hockey Writers. On 21 June 2019, he was selected in the first round, sixth overall, by the Detroit Red Wings. On 14 July, he signed a three-year, entry-level contract with the Red Wings.

On 4 August 2020, Seider was loaned to his original club, Adler Mannheim of the Deutsche Eishockey Liga (DEL), to begin the 2020–21 season due to the delayed North American season as a consequence of the COVID-19 pandemic. On 8 October, with no start date for the DEL in sight, the Red Wings terminated his loan with Mannheim. It was announced on the same day that he would instead be loaned to Rögle BK of the Swedish Hockey League (SHL) for the remainder of the season, joining former Adler Mannheim teammate Ben Smith. After the 2020–21 season, Seider was named the SHL defenceman of the year.

Seider made the Red Wings opening day roster out of training camp to start the 2021–22 NHL season. Seider was named the NHL Rookie of the Month for October 2021 after recording eight points in nine games. On 6 November 2021, Seider scored his first NHL goal, in overtime against Buffalo Sabres goaltender Dustin Tokarski in a 4–3 Red Wings win. Seider scored seven goals and 43 assists during his first season with the Red Wings. He led first-year defensemen in assists, points, power-play points, game-winning goals and shots on goal, and ranked second in goals. On 21 June 2022, he was announced as the winner of the Calder Memorial Trophy, awarded to the player deemed the most proficient player in his first year of competition in the National Hockey League.

International play
At the 2019 World Junior Championship Division IA tournament, he led all defensemen in scoring, captaining Germany to a first-place finish and promotion to the top division of the following year's tournament, where he once again served as captain. He would opt not to participate at the 2021 tournament, deciding instead to stay with Rögle. At the 2021 IIHF World Championship, Seider was awarded Best Defenceman by the IIHF directorate and was a member of the All-Star Team selected by the media.

In October 2021, Seider was named as one of three provisional players for Germany's 2022 Olympic roster for the Beijing Games, alongside Leon Draisaitl and Philipp Grubauer.

Career statistics

Regular season and playoffs

International

Awards and honours

References

External links
 

2001 births
Living people
Adler Mannheim players
Calder Trophy winners
Detroit Red Wings draft picks
Detroit Red Wings players
German ice hockey defencemen
Grand Rapids Griffins players
National Hockey League first-round draft picks
People from Zell (Mosel)
Rögle BK players
Sportspeople from Rhineland-Palatinate